Catherine Fenton Boyle, Countess of Cork (1588 – 16 February 1630) was an Irish aristocrat and wife of Richard Boyle, 1st Earl of Cork.

Biography
Catherine Fenton Boyle was born around 1588. She was the only daughter of Secretary of State for Ireland 1580–1608, Sir Geoffrey Fenton, and Alice (née Weston). Her maternal grandfather was Robert Weston, Lord Chancellor of Ireland, and her grandmother was his first wife Alice Jenyngs. She had one brother, Sir William Fenton. On 25 July 1603 she married Richard Boyle, 1st Earl of Cork. Her dowry of £1,000 allowed Boyle to purchase the estates of Sir Walter Raleigh in east Cork. She could have been as young as 15 at the marriage, and Richard was 37. The age difference may have made Richard paternalistic towards Boyle, allowing her little freedom even in domestic affairs. He oversaw the household accounts, purchased and chose his wife's clothes, did not allow her to borrow money, and did not seek her opinion on the education or marriages of their children. He commented on her as being "most religious, virtuous, loving and obedient". The family moved to Youghal in 1605, where Richard bought the lease of a former college, converting it into a home. He purchased the Chantry of our Blessed Saviour, and made it into a family mortuary chapel. He was eventually buried there, but not Boyle, however, she is represented by a marble effigy in the state robe of a countess.

Her husband purchased Lismore Castle, moving the family there, where the family divided their time between the castle and Cork House in Dublin. Boyle died on 16 February 1630 in Cork House, Dublin, and was buried with her father and grandfather in St Patrick's cathedral. Her husband erected a marble tomb in their honour at the upper end of the chancel, but the new lord deputy, Thomas Wentworth, 1st Earl of Strafford forced the movement of the tomb to the side of the cathedral. Richard did not remarry, and dedicated the anniversary of her death to mourning each year. A book of elegies was printed in her honour, composed by the fellows of Trinity College Dublin titled Musarum Lachrymae.

Issue

Boyle had 15 children with Richard, 12 of whom survived into adulthood.

Roger Boyle (1 August 1606, Youghal, County Cork, Ireland–10 October 1615, Deptford, Kent, England, where he was buried).
Lady Alice Boyle (1607–1667), married David Barry, 1st Earl of Barrymore, then after his death, married John Barry, of Liscarroll, co Cork, Ireland.
Lady Sarah Boyle (1609–1633), married Sir Thomas Moore, then after his death married Robert Digby, 1st Baron Digby.
Lady Lettice Boyle (1610–1657), married Colonel George Goring, Lord Goring.
Lady Joan Boyle (1611–1657), married George FitzGerald, 16th Earl of Kildare ("the Fairy Earl").
Richard Boyle, 2nd Earl of Cork and 1st Earl of Burlington (1612–1698), Lord High Treasurer of Ireland (1660–1695).
Lady Katherine Boyle (1615–1691), married Arthur Jones, 2nd Viscount Ranelagh.
Hon. Geoffrey Boyle (1616–1617)
Lady Dorothy Boyle (1617–1668), married Sir Arthur Loftus of Rathfarnham and was the mother of Adam Loftus, 1st Viscount Lisburne.
Lewis Boyle, 1st Viscount Boyle of Kinalmeaky (1619–1642), succeeded under special remainder by his older brother Richard.
Roger Boyle, 1st Earl of Orrery (1621–1679)
Francis Boyle, 1st Viscount Shannon (1623–1699)
Lady Mary Boyle (1625–1678), married Charles Rich, 4th Earl of Warwick.
Hon. Robert Boyle (1627–1691), author of The Sceptical Chymist; considered to be the father of modern chemistry.
Lady Margaret Boyle (1629–1637)

References

1630 deaths
Year of birth uncertain
Catherine
17th-century Anglo-Irish people
Cork
Burials at St Patrick's Cathedral, Dublin